Symphyotrichum tenuifolium (formerly Aster tenuifolius) is a species of flowering plant in the family Asteraceae and is commonly known as perennial saltmarsh aster. It is a perennial and herbaceous plant native to the eastern United States and the West Indies. There is one variety, S. tenuifolium var. aphyllum in addition to the autonym S. tenuifolium var. tenuifolium.

Gallery

Conservation
, NatureServe lists Symphyotrichum tenuifolium as Secure (G5) worldwide, Critically Imperiled (S1) in New Hampshire, Imperiled (S2) in New York, and Vulnerable (S3) in North Carolina.

Citations

References 

 
 

 

tenuifolium
Flora of the Southeastern United States
Flora of the Caribbean
Plants described in 1753
Taxa named by Carl Linnaeus